The Thermosalinograph or TSG is an measuring instrument mounted near the water intake of ships to continuously measure sea surface temperature and conductivity while the ship is in motion. Various programs have been developed to assist in the collection and analysis of data from a TSG. The data can be used to calculate salinity, density, sound velocity within the water, and other parameters. There are various types of thermosalinographs available on the market today.

Background

Programs collecting TSG data 
NOAA fleet 
Ship of Opportunity Program (SOOP) 
Global Ocean Observing System (GOOS)
GOSUD Global Ocean Surface Underway Data (http://www.gosud.org)

Measurement devices
The thermosalinograph uses a conductivity cell to measure conductivity, which can then be translated into a value of salinity. Also a thermistor cell measures the temperature of the surface water, which when combined with the conductivity can be used calculate the density of the water and the sound velocity within it.

Types

Sources of error
Water is measured in the engine room, which can cause biases from heat in the room.

References

Water transport
Measuring instruments